Old is the surname of:

 Alan Old (born 1945), English rugby union player
 Ashley George Old (1913–2001), British artist
 Chris Old (born 1948), English cricketer
 Dick Old (1922–2007), Australian politician
 Hughes Oliphant Old (born 1933), American theologian
 Lloyd J. Old (1933–2011), cancer researcher
 Richard Old (1856–1932), English woodcraftsman and model maker
 Steven Old (born 1986), New Zealand footballer
 William E. Old Jr. (1928–1982), American malacologist

See also
 Olde, a list of people with the surname